Eichstruth is a municipality in the district of Eichsfeld in Thuringia, Germany. By area, it is the smallest municipality in what was East Germany, although there are 35 rural municipalities ("Gemeinden") and one city ("Stadt"), Arnis, in what was West Germany that have lesser or equal area (as of 31 December 2012).

References

Eichsfeld (district)